Liu Wei (born October 27, 1969) is a former female table tennis player from China. From 1989 to 1996 she won several medals in singles, doubles, and team events in the Asian Table Tennis Championships, in the Table Tennis World Cup, and in the World Table Tennis Championships. She also achieved a silver Olympic medal in the double event at Atlanta 1996.

Hall of Fame
She is inducted in the ITTF hall of fame.

See also
 List of table tennis players
 List of World Table Tennis Championships medalists

References

External links
 

Chinese female table tennis players
Olympic medalists in table tennis
Living people
Asian Games medalists in table tennis
Table tennis players at the 1994 Asian Games
1969 births
People from Liaocheng
Table tennis players from Shandong
Olympic table tennis players of China
Asian Games gold medalists for China
Medalists at the 1994 Asian Games
World Table Tennis Championships medalists
Olympic silver medalists for China
Table tennis players at the 1996 Summer Olympics
Medalists at the 1996 Summer Olympics